The 1964 Air Force Falcons football team represented the United States Air Force Academy as an independent during the 1964 NCAA University Division football season. Led by seventh-year head coach Ben Martin, the Falcons compiled a record of 4–5–1 and were outscored by their opponents 146–106. Air Force played their home games at Falcon Stadium in Colorado Springs, Colorado.

Schedule

References

Air Force
Air Force Falcons football seasons
Air Force Falcons football